Marko Bjeković (born 21 September 2000) is a Serbian footballer playing for Vojvodina.

Club career

Vojvodina
On 19 May 2019, Bjeković made his first team debut, replacing another debutante Andrej Jakovljević in 82nd minute of 1:1 away draw with Čukarički.

Career statistics

Club

References

External links
 
 

2000 births
Living people
Footballers from Novi Sad
Association football defenders
Serbian footballers
FK Vojvodina players
FK Kabel players
Serbian SuperLiga players
Serbian First League players
Serbia under-21 international footballers